Amberg is a Bavarian, Austrian and Swiss German toponymic surname, and it originated in Bavaria after the city Amberg, but can come from any of several places named Amberg. It may refer to:

 Ernst Julius Amberg (1871–1951), Swiss mathematician and mountain climber
 Hans Christian Amberg (1749–1815), Danish lexicographer
 Hans Christian Amberg (architect) (1837–1919), Danish architect
 Herman Amberg (1834–1902), Danish musician and composer
 Herman Amberg (educator) (1754–1837), Danish-Norwegian educator
 Hyman Amberg (c. 1902–1926), New York mobster
 Johan Amberg (1846–1928), Danish composer and violinist
 John Amberg (1929–2004), American football player
 Joseph C. Amberg (1892–1935), New York mobster
 Leo Amberg (1912–1999), Swiss professional road bicycle racer
 Louis Amberg (1897–1935), New York mobster
 Michael Amberg (1926–2001), British fencer
 Rob Amberg (born 1947), North Carolina photographer
 Wilhelm Amberg (1822–1899), German genre painter
 Zoël Amberg (born 1992), Swiss professional racing driver

Danish-language surnames
English-language surnames
German-language surnames
Patronymic surnames